Brier Creek is a stream in the U.S. state of West Virginia. It is a tributary of the Big Coal River.

Brier Creek was named for the brier plants near its course.

See also
List of rivers of West Virginia

References

Rivers of Kanawha County, West Virginia
Rivers of West Virginia